USS Coolbaugh (DE-217) was a  in service with the United States Navy from 1943 to 1960. She was scrapped in 1973.

Namesake
Coolbaugh was named in honor of Lieutenant (junior grade) Walter Wesley Coolbaugh. He was born on 1 August 1914 in Ransom, Pennsylvania. He enlisted in the United States Naval Reserve for aviation training on 14 November 1940. Serving in a scouting squadron in the Pacific, he received the Navy Cross for his conduct in the Battle of the Coral Sea in May 1942. Coolbaugh was promoted to lieutenant (junior grade) on 1 October 1942, and lost his life in an aircraft accident on 19 December 1942.

History
USS Coolbaugh was launched 29 May 1943 by Philadelphia Navy Yard; sponsored by Mrs. A. Coolbaugh; and commissioned 15 October 1943.

World War II, 1943–1945
After escorting merchantmen across the Pacific, Coolbaugh reached Efate 8 February 1944, and at once began to serve on patrol and as escort in the Solomons. She joined in the invasion of Emirau Island from 9 to 16 April, and on several occasions voyaged to Manus, Emirau, and Eniwetok on escort duty.

Coolbaugh arrived at Manus 10 October 1944 to join the 7th Fleet, and put to sea two days later for pre-invasion air strikes on Leyte which began on 18 October. She guarded the escort carriers as they covered the landings and as they gallantly defied the efforts of a strong Japanese surface force to break up the landings in the Battle off Samar, phase of the decisive Battle of Leyte Gulf on 25 October, and next day saved 91 men thrown overboard when  was damaged by kamikaze. Coolbaugh escorted Suwanee to safety at Manus.

Between 19 and 27 November 1944, Coolbaugh screened escort carriers as they provided air cover for convoys supplying forces in Leyte Gulf, and then sailed to New Guinea to prepare for the Lingayen assault. Through January and February 1945, she screened transports carrying reinforcements to Lingayen Gulf, serving on patrol within the gulf during each such voyage. Between 28 February and 4 March, she sailed from Ulithi to Iwo Jima to carry away men who had made the original landings, upon their relief by other forces. She returned to Iwo Jima to patrol off the island until 27 March, when she cleared for Pearl Harbor.

Coolbaugh provided escort and other services to ships training in the Hawaiian Islands until 4 September 1945, when she arrived at San Francisco for overhaul and training on the west coast.

Post-war operations, 1946–1960
Early in January 1946, she arrived at Newport, Rhode Island, her assigned homeport, and began local operations in submarine training and other exercises. On 25 January she aided in providing electric power for Block Island, where the powerhouse had been damaged in a fire. Continuing her coastwise and Caribbean operations, she acted as plane guard during anti-submarine exercises, was schoolship for the Fleet Sonar School at Key West, Florida, and during the summer of 1954 called at ports in Ireland and England on a midshipman training cruise. Summer 1956 found her again on this duty.

Assigned permanently to the Fleet Sonar School at Key West on 22 August 1957, Coolbaugh thereafter operated primarily in Florida waters, often cruising with members of the Naval Reserve on board for training. She was decommissioned 21 February 1960 at Saint Petersburg, Florida, and placed in service until 26 May, when she was placed out of service in reserve.

Awards
Coolbaugh received three battle stars for World War II service.

References

External links 

 

Buckley-class destroyer escorts
Ships built in Philadelphia
World War II frigates and destroyer escorts of the United States
1943 ships